Labate is a surname. Notable people with the surname include:

Barbara Labate (born c. 1978), Italian entrepreneur and business executive
Joseph LaBate (born 1993), American professional ice hockey player
Wilma Labate (born 1949), Italian film director and screenwriter